Pseudomicronia advocataria is a moth of the family Uraniidae first described by Francis Walker in 1861. It is found in the Philippines, Sundaland, the Andaman Islands, India, Taiwan, South China and  Sri Lanka.

It is a white moth with black fasciations. Black dots are found on the tail margins of the hindwings.

References

Moths of Asia
Moths described in 1861
Uraniidae